Louis Oliver (April 9, 1904 – May 10, 1991), also known as Little Coon or Wotkoce Okisce, was a citizen of the Muscogee Nation and an American poet. His poetry combines themes of Muscogee oral history with an examination of intellectualism in the context of the Muscogee Nation.

Early life and education 
Oliver was born on April 9, 1904, in Coweta, Indian Territory, which became part of Oklahoma in 1907. His parents died when he was young and he was raised by relatives in Okfuskee. He studied at the Euchee Indian School and then Bacone College, where he graduated in 1926. Unlike many of his contemporaries, he earned a diploma in 1926, an accomplishment that alienated some other Muscogee who accused him of "capitulating to the White Man's ways".

Career 

While living among the Cherokee in Tahlequah, Oklahoma, in the early 1980s, Oliver joined a writing group that included several published authors, and moved away from the more classical European forms of poetry that he had been practicing until then. He became the author of two books of poetry, Caught in a willow net: poems and stories (Greenfield Review Press, 1983) and Chasers of the Sun: Creek Indian thoughts  (Greenfield Review Press, 1990). 

One of his poems, about and in the form of a tornado, is included in the Wall poems in Leiden outdoor poetry project in Leiden, Netherlands.

Honors 
In 1987, the Este Mvskoke Arts Council of the Muscogee people gave him their inaugural Alexander Posey Literary Award.

Death 
He died on May 10, 1991, in Muskogee, Oklahoma.

References

1904 births
1991 deaths
20th-century American poets
Muscogee (Creek) Nation people
Native American writers
People from Coweta, Oklahoma
American male poets
Poets from Oklahoma
Bacone College alumni
20th-century American male writers
20th-century Native Americans